Alexander Romanov (born August 18, 1980) is a Russian professional ice hockey winger who currently plays and captains Metallurg Novokuznetsk of the Kontinental Hockey League (KHL).

Career 
A veteran of 17 professional top flight Russian seasons, Romanov joined Novokuznetsk from HC Sibir Novosibirsk as a free agent on August 20, 2014.

References

External links

1980 births
Living people
Russian ice hockey right wingers
HC Khimik Voskresensk players
Metallurg Novokuznetsk players
HC Sibir Novosibirsk players
Torpedo Nizhny Novgorod players
HC Vityaz players
People from Voskresensk
Sportspeople from Moscow Oblast